Anthony Beanland (born 11 January 1944) is an English former professional footballer who played as a defender. He made appearances in the English Football League for Southport, Southend United, Wrexham and Bradford Park Avenue.

References

1944 births
Living people
Footballers from Bradford
Blackpool F.C. players
Southport F.C. players
Southend United F.C. players
Wrexham A.F.C. players
Bradford (Park Avenue) A.F.C. players
Knowsley United F.C. players
English footballers
Association football defenders
English Football League players